ABCmouse.com Early Learning Academy is a subscription-based digital education program for children ages 2–8, created by Age of Learning, Inc. Subscribers can access learning activities on the ABCmouse.com website or mobile app. Subjects covered include reading and language arts, math, science, health, social studies, music, and art. 

The content on ABCmouse currently consists of more than 10,000 learning activities and 850 lessons. The program, with e-books, printouts, games, and progress tracker, can be used online or offline. The program added an ABCmouse Classroom Live! feature in September 2020 that offers a daily interactive virtual classroom experience led by teachers offering curriculum-based activities for pre-K and kindergarten-aged children.  

In 2020, ABCmouse parent company Age of Learning, Inc., without admitting guilt, agreed to pay $10 million and settle a Federal Trade Commission complaint alleging that some of its past marketing and billing practices were unfair.

Age of Learning, Inc. 
ABCmouse.com is produced by Age of Learning, Inc., a privately owned education technology company. Headquartered in Glendale, California, the company was founded in 2007 by Doug Dohring and is currently led by CEO Paul Candland. Age of Learning launched ABCmouse.com in 2010 after three years of development, guided by a team of educators, and following testing by 10,000 families. The company has obtained several patents including the original patent for a vertically integrated educational system.

Members of Age of Learning's Curriculum Board include 2006 National Teacher of the Year Award recipient Kimberly Oliver Burnim, 2014 National Teachers Hall of Fame inductee Dr. Rebecca Palacios, NORC Research Scientist Marc Hernandez, and Science Writing Award-winning writer Stephen M. Tomecek.

In 2014, at the White House Summit on Early Education, Age of Learning pledged to the Invest In Us campaign to provide services valued at more than $10 million to preschool, pre-K, and Head Start classrooms over two years. In 2015, the company partnered with another White House initiative, ConnectHome, to provide ABCmouse.com for free to families living in public housing in 27 cities and one tribal nation, serving up to 65,000 children.

In 2016, it was reported that Age of Learning raised $150 million from ICONIQ Capital, giving the company a $1 billion valuation. Age of Learning also launched ABCmouse for Schools in 2016; the enterprise-level solution won an ISTE Best of Show Award at the annual edtech conference.

In 2015, the company collaborated with the National Opinion Research Center at the University of Chicago to develop a series of web-based assessments. The Assessment Center includes over 8,500 items via 300 assessments.

In 2018, the company partnered with Tencent to launch the ABCmouse English Language Learning program in China.

In 2019, the company launched Adventure Academy, an educational app and game for children ages 8-13. It is an MMO with three-dimensional and multi-platform support, along with a core curriculum taught in schools and thousands of education activities.   

In January 2020, it launched The Age of Learning Foundation, a charitable organization that works with governments, NGOs and UNESCO's Global Education Coalition to provide the company's digital learning products at no cost to children worldwide. In September 2020, the company agreed to settle a Federal Trade Commission complaint alleging that some of its past marketing and billing practices were unfair or deceptive. The complaint focused on the 2015 – 2018 time period and affected tens of thousands of consumers, which the company claimed to be less than 2% of ABCmouse subscribers. The company did not admit guilt but agreed to pay $10 million to settle the charges and avoid a prolonged legal dispute. They also agreed to a number of marketing, billing, and cancellation practices specified by the FTC, many of which the company claims had already been implemented years ago.

In June 2021, Age of Learning announced its new Schools Division and rollout of its first product offering, My Math Academy, a personalized, adaptive math program for pre-K through second grade, which has been tested in several school districts in the U.S.

On June 29, 2021, it was reported that Age of Learning closed a $300 million round of funding—led by TPG, along with the Qatar Investment Authority, Madrone Capital Partners, and Tencent Holdings Ltd.—which valued the company at $3 billion. CEO Paul Candland was quoted by Bloomberg as saying the funding would be used for the company’s international expansion and development of new products.

Content and structure 
ABCmouse.com Early Learning Academy content currently consists of more than 10,000 learning activities and 850 lessons. The preschool through second grade curriculum is laid out in a sequence called the “Step by Step Learning Path.” Parents can register up to three children and set each one at his or her own level based on age and ability. Children can also use any of the content outside of the set learning path. Activities include videos, coloring activities, learning games, poems, puzzles and songs that cover reading and writing, math, art, music, social studies, science, and health. There are also more than 1,000 digital books, including over 100 Stepped Readers. The same content is available whether children log on using their computer or mobile device (iOS, Android, Kindle).

To some, the amount of content “seems almost endless” but can be “almost overwhelming,” suggesting children will “likely need help navigating the site.” Others have judged it “easy enough for even the youngest computer users” and “well designed for children to use” with an “interface that is intuitive for them.”

Children navigate the site with the aid of “voice-overs, images, and text,” but younger children may need help. Children earn tickets each time they complete a learning activity, which they can use to shop at virtual stores to decorate their room or “buy” things for their pets.

Products 
The ABCmouse.com Early Learning Academy curriculum can be accessed on tablets and smartphones using apps from the Apple App Store, Google Play, and the Amazon Appstore for Android. Age of Learning also launched ABCmouse Language Arts Animations, ABCmouse Mastering Math, ABCmouse Mathematics Animations, ABCmouse Science Animations, ABCmouse Music Videos, and ABCmouse Zoo apps in the same app stores. These apps can be used online or offline and are available to ABCmouse members.

ABCmouse.com is also made available at no cost to teachers, Head Start programs, public libraries, public housing authorities, and other community organizations.

As of 2016, ABCmouse for Teachers was used in more than 65,000 classrooms and ABCmouse for Libraries was available at one-third of U.S. public libraries, including all branches in Los Angeles, Chicago, Houston, and Brooklyn.

ABCmouse for Schools, a product designed for school districts or chains of schools, launched at the 2016 ISTE conference.

Some Age of Learning apps, such as its Aesop's Fables series and Beginning Reader series, have been discontinued and are instead available on the ABCmouse.com YouTube channel.

Educational value 
In 2017, a two-year longitudinal study published in the Journal of Applied Research on Children concluded that the use of ABCmouse Early Learning Academy improved school readiness and accelerated students’ learning gains in math and literacy skills. Several randomized controlled trials have been conducted on ABCmouse showing gains to reading and math.

References

External Reading 
 ABCmouse.com Official Website
 AgeofLearning.com

Virtual learning environments
Companies based in Glendale, California
American children's websites
Education companies established in 2010
Internet properties established in 2010
2010 establishments in California
American companies established in 2010
American educational websites